Olaria Atlético Clube, usually abbreviated to Olaria, is a Brazilian football club established in 1915, since expanded into other sports. Mostly known for its Brazilian football team based in the city of Rio de Janeiro, in the neighbourhood of Olaria. The team compete in Campeonato Carioca Série B1, the second tier of the Rio de Janeiro state football league.

The club name means brick factory, and is also the name of the club's neighborhood.

Olaria is one of the small clubs from Rio de Janeiro that have managed to remain active in the shade of the four big ones (Botafogo, Flamengo, Fluminense and Vasco da Gama).

History
On July 1, 1915, the club was founded as Japonês Futebol Clube (Japanese Football Club, in English). The club was later in that year renamed to Olaria Atlético Clube, by Calorino Martins Arantes, who was a club director, to attract more supporters.

In 1974, Olaria competed in the Série A, finishing in the 28th position.

In 1981, Olaria won the Série C, called Taça de Bronze (Bronze Cup). In the final, the club beat Santo Amaro of Pernambuco state. In 1983, the club won the Campeonato Carioca Second Division, being promoted to the following year's first division.

In 1999, an enterprise called Sport News assumed the club's football section for a short time period.

In 2000, Olaria was in the White Module (which was the equivalent of a third level) of that season's Série A, named Copa João Havelange. The club was eliminated in the first stage. In 2003, the club competed again in the Campeonato Brasileiro Série C. Olaria was eliminated in the third stage by fellow Rio de Janeiro state club Cabofriense.

Achievements
 Campeonato Brasileiro Série C:
 Winners (1): 1981
 Campeonato Carioca Série A2:
 Winners (4): 1931, 1938, 1980, 1983
 Campeonato Carioca Série B1:
 Winners (1): 2021

Stadium

Home stadium is Estádio da Rua Bariri, which has a maximum capacity of 11,000 people. This stadium is often rented to the big clubs (notably Flamengo) when they are unable to play at the Maracanã or at the Engenhão.

Anthem
The club's official anthem was composed by Lamartine Babo, who composed the anthems of the Rio de Janeiro big clubs.

Mascot
The club's mascot is an Indian.

Other sports
Besides football, Olaria also has other sports sections, such as futsal, button football, football society, karate, judo, basketball and swimming.

References

External links
Official website
Olaria at Arquivo de Clubes
website non-official
[https://www.olaria.net/
[https://radiojovemolaria.com/

 
Association football clubs established in 1915
Football clubs in Rio de Janeiro (state)
Football clubs in Rio de Janeiro (city)
1915 establishments in Brazil

war:Olaria